Yordanov (masculine) or Yordanova (feminine) is one of the most popular surnames in Bulgaria. People commonly known by their family name Yordanov include:

 Ivaylo Yordanov, Bulgarian football player
 Nedyalko Yordanov, Bulgarian poet
 Stoyan Yordanov, Bulgarian football player
 Valentin Yordanov, Bulgarian sport wrestler

Bulgarian-language surnames